Erastus is a masculine given name which may refer to:

Biblical figures:
 Erastus of Corinth, in the New Testament of the Bible

People:
 Erastus of Scepsis, 4th century BC student of Plato
 Erastus Newton Bates (1828–1898), American politician and Civil War brigadier general
 Erastus Flavel Beadle (1821–1894), American printer and pioneer publisher of pulp fiction
 Erastus C. Benedict (1800–1880), American lawyer and politician
 Erastus Brigham Bigelow (1814–1879), inventor of weaving machines
 Erastus Brooks (1815–1886), American newspaper editor and politician
 Erastus Corning (1794–1872), businessman and politician
 Erastus Corning 2nd (1909–1983), mayor of Albany, New York, great-grandson of the above
 Erastus Milo Cravath (1833–1900), American abolitionist, field secretary with the American Missionary Association, co-founder and president of Fisk University and founder of numerous other historically black colleges
 Erastus D. Culver (1803–1889), American anti-slavery activist, attorney, politician, judge and diplomat
 Erastus Fairbanks (1792–1864), American manufacturer and politician, a founder of the Republican Party and twice Governor of Vermont
 Erastus Salisbury Field (1805–1900), American folk art painter
 Erastus Otis Haven (1820–1881),  American bishop of the Methodist Episcopal Church and president of the University of Michigan and Northwestern University
 Erastus Hussey (1800–1889), American abolitionist and one of the founders of the Republican Party
 Erastus C. Knight (1857–1923), American businessman and politician
 Erastus Dow Palmer (1817–1904), American sculptor
 Erastus Root (1773–1846), American lawyer and politician
 Erastus G. Smith (1855–1937), American politician
 Erastus Snow (1818–1888), Mormon religious official
 Erastus D. Telford (1874–1936), American lawyer and politician
 Erastus J. Turner (1846–1933), American politician
 Erastus B. Tyler (1822–1891), American businessman, merchant and American Civil War Union Army officer
 Erastus Uutoni (born 1961), Namibian politician
 Erastus Wells (1823–1893), American politician and businessman
 Erastus Wentworth (1813–1886), American educator, Methodist Episcopal minister and missionary in China
 Erastus Wiman (1834–1904), Canadian journalist and businessman and a developer in the New York City borough of Staten Island

English masculine given names